Robert, Archduke of Austria-Este (given names: Robert Karl Ludwig Maximilian Michael Maria Anton Franz Ferdinand Joseph Otto Hubert Georg Pius Johannes Marcus d'Aviano; 8 February 1915 – 7 February 1996), was the second son of Karl I, (beatified) last Emperor of Austria-Hungary, and Princess Zita of Bourbon-Parma. He was also known as Robert Karl Erzherzog von Österreich.

Archduke of Austria-Este

On 16 April 1917, at the age of two, his father the Emperor ceded the title of Archduke of Austria-Este in Robert's favor. Archduke Robert was thereby chosen to preserve, in the form of a distinct secundogeniture, the Habsburg-Lorraine representation of the once-sovereign Duchy of Modena which had belonged to the House of Este. He was thus made heir to his assassinated relative Archduke Franz Ferdinand of Austria (1863–1914), who had inherited in 1875 the Austria-Este designation and what had been salvaged of the Este fortune when the duchy was annexed to Italy in 1860.

Family
Archduke Robert married Princess Margherita of Savoy-Aosta (7 April 1930 – 10 January 2022, elder daughter of the late Amadeo, 3rd Duke of Aosta) on 28 December 1953 in Bourg-en-Bresse, Ain, France (civilly) and 29 December 1953, in Brou, Eure-et-Loir, France (religiously).
The couple had five children:
 Archduchess Maria Beatrice (born 11 December 1954) married on 26 April 1980 in Chartres Count Riprand of Arco-Zinneberg, a great-grandson of the last Bavarian king, Ludwig III and of Maria Theresia, Archduchess of Austria-Este. They have six daughters:
 Countess Anna Theresa von und zu Arco-Zinneberg (born 1981) married on 29 September 2018, at Niederaltaich Abbey in Bavaria, Colin McKenzie (born 1976). They have two children.
 Countess Margherita von und zu Arco-Zinneberg (born 1983) married on 19 March 2022, in Moos, Bavaria, Charles Douglas Green (born 1981)
 Countess Olympia von und zu Arco-Zinneberg (born 1988) married on 17 October 2019, in Neuilly-sur-Seine, France, Jean-Christophe, Prince Napoléon (born 1986)
 Countess Maximiliana von und zu Arco-Zinneberg (born 1990) is engaged in 2022 to Byron Houdayer (born 1986)
 Countess Marie Gabrielle von und zu Arco-Zinneberg (born 1992), who is a mezzo-soprano opera singer
 Countess Giorgiana von und zu Arco-Zinneberg (born 1997)
 Archduke Lorenz (born 16 December 1955) married on 22 September 1984 at Brussels, Princess Astrid of Belgium (born 1962), daughter of King Albert II of the Belgians. They have three daughters and two sons:
Prince Amedeo of Belgium, Archduke of Austria-Este (born 1986) married Elisabetta Rosboch von Wolkenstein on 5 July 2014 in Rome, Italy. They have two children.
 Princess Maria Laura of Belgium, Archduchess of Austria-Este (born 1988) married William Isvy (born 1991) on 10 September 2022 in Brussels, Belgium.
 Prince Joachim of Belgium, Archduke of Austria-Este (born 1991)
 Princess Luisa Maria of Belgium, Archduchess of Austria-Este (born 1995)
 Princess Laetitia Maria of Belgium, Archduchess of Austria-Este (born 2003)
 Archduke Gerhard (born 30 October 1957) married in 2015 Iris Jandrasits (born 1961). 
 Archduke Martin (born 21 December 1959) married in 2004 Princess Katharina of Isenburg, sister of Sophie, Princess of Prussia and Isabelle, Princess of Wied. They have three sons and a daughter:
 Archduke Bartholomaeus of Austria (2006)
 Archduke Emmanuel of Austria (2008) 
 Archduchess Helene of Austria (2009)
 Archduke Luigi of Austria (2011)
 Archduchess Isabella (born 2 March 1963) married in 1997 Count Andrea Czarnocki-Lucheschi. They have three sons and a daughter:
 Alvise Czarnocki-Lucheschi (1999)
 Carlo Amedeo Czarnocki-Lucheschi (2000)
 Maria Anna Czarnocki-Lucheschi (2002)
 Alessandro Czarnocki-Lucheschi (2004)

Ancestry

References

Austria-Este
House of Habsburg
Knights of the Golden Fleece of Austria
1915 births
1996 deaths
Austrian princes
Sons of emperors
Child pretenders
Children of Charles I of Austria
Sons of kings